Sankt Augustin (Ripuarian: Sank Aujustin) is a town in the Rhein-Sieg district, in North Rhine-Westphalia, Germany. It is named after the patron saint of the Divine Word Missionaries, Saint Augustine of Hippo (354-430). The Missionaries established a monastery near the current town centre in 1913. The municipality of Sankt Augustin was established in 1969, and on September 6, 1977 Sankt Augustin acquired town privileges (German: Stadtrechte). Sankt Augustin is situated about eight km north-east of Bonn and three km south-west of Siegburg.

Mayors

1969–1984: Karl Gatzweiler (CDU)
1989–1994: Wilfried Wessel (CDU)
1994–1995: Anke Riefers (SPD)
1995:      Hans Jaax (SPD) (temporary)
1995–1999: Anke Riefers (SPD)
1999–2020: Klaus Schumacher (CDU)
Since 2020: Max Leitterstorf (CDU)

Twin towns – sister cities

Sankt Augustin is twinned with:
 Grantham, England, United Kingdom 
 Mevaseret Zion, Israel
 Szentes, Hungary

Government organizations
 West Regional Command German Federal Police (Bundespolizei), headquarter of the Police tactical unit GSG 9 (Grenzschutzgruppe 9)
 Logistics of unified armed forces of Germany (Bundeswehr)
 Institute for Occupational Safety and Health of the German Social Accident Insurance
 The „Zwischenarchiv Sankt Augustin-Hangelar“; one of the two "interim deposit" branches of the Bundesarchiv (the other one located at Hoppegarten near Berlin), used for temporary storage of federal government documents

Notable people
Erich Hampe (1889–1978), army officer, died here
Helmut Rohde (1925–2016), politician (SPD), died here
Gábor Benedek (born 1927), Hungarian modern pentathlete, Olympic champion, lives here
Klaus Förster (1933–2009), tax fraud investigator in Sankt Augustin
Klaus Kinkel (1936–2019), lawyer and politician (FDP), died here
Ute Kircheis-Wessel (born 1953), fencer, Olympic winner, works here
Bettina Bähr-Losse (born 1967), politician (SPD) and former member of the Bundestag, works here
Oliver Masucci (born 1968), actor, grew up in Mülldorf
Luciana Diniz (born 1970), Brazilian horsewoman, lives here

References